National Park(s) Association may refer to:

Madagascar National Parks Association, a private group managing protected areas in Madagascar
National Parks Conservation Association, an independent National Parks System advocacy organization in the United States that was previously named the National Parks Association (from 1919 to 1970)
National Recreation and Park Association, an environmental advocacy group in the United States
San Francisco Maritime National Park Association, a group that supports the National Historical Park in California, USA
Victorian National Parks Association, the prime supporter of nature conservation in the Australian state of Victoria
Voyageurs National Park Association, an organization to protect and promote Voyageurs National Park, Minnesota, USA